Kilpauk is a semi residential area located in Chennai, Tamil Nadu, India. The distance from Chennai's city to Kilpauk is about 6 km. The region is situated off the Poonamallee High Road in the west. Adjacent areas of Kilpauk include Chetpet, Kellys,  Egmore, Ayanavaram,  Anna Nagar, Choolaimedu  and Purasawalkam.

The nearest railway station for Kilpauk is the one at Chetpet.  This railway station lies to the south of Kilpauk and not more than a kilometre away. There are two metro stations which connects to Kilpauk, they are Nehru Park and Kilpauk (entrance of the Kilpauk Medical College). The Chennai Airport is about 18 km from Kilpauk.

This place was a cantonment area for British troops before India's independence. Today this locality is known as "Little Korea" due to the Korean population residing in this area.

The neighbourhood has a historical water-treatment plant.
On the other end, to the west, is the Institute of Mental Health, one of the oldest mental asyla in the continent, visited by Elizabeth II.

Localities

 Kilpauk Garden
 Kelly's Corner
 Aspiran Garden
 Secretariat Colony

Educational Institutions

Seth P D Hinduja Sindhi Model Senior Secondary School
C S I Bain school
Bhavan's Rajaji Vidyashram
Chinmaya Vidyalaya
Kola Saraswati  
Rukmani Vidyalaya changed as Ramachandra
MES Razeena Matriculation Higher Secondary School

Both the Directorate of Medical Education and Government Kilpauk Medical College are located on EVR Periyar Salai. Kilpauk is also well known for engineering college head offices, including Rajalakshmi Institutions and Sree Sastha Institute of Engineering and Technology.

References

Neighbourhoods in Chennai
Suburbs of Chennai